United Bankshares, Inc. is a bank holding company dual-headquartered in Charleston, West Virginia and Fairfax, Virginia with operations in West Virginia, Virginia, the District of Columbia, Maryland, Ohio, Pennsylvania, North Carolina, South Carolina, and Georgia in the United States. United Bankshares is the parent company of United Bank which comprises nearly 250 offices in eight states. In addition, UBSI is the parent company to subsidiaries George Mason Mortgage, United Brokerage, and Crescent Mortgage.

Based on total deposits, United Bank is the largest bank headquartered in West Virginia and the 2nd largest bank operating in West Virginia, after Truist Financial. It is the 8th largest bank operating in Virginia and the 10th largest bank operating in the District of Columbia.

History
The company traces its roots to St. Patrick's Day 1839, when Northwestern Bank of Virginia opened an office in Parkersburg (now in West Virginia). On St. Patrick's Day, some branches honor the tradition by giving shamrocks to customers. That office eventually evolved into Parkersburg National Bank.

Richard Adams was named Chairman and CEO of Parkersburg National Bank in 1975. In 1982, Parkersburg National began reorganizing as a holding company, United Bankshares. In 1984, United commenced full operations when it acquired Parkersburg National and two other banks. In 1987, the company became a public company via an initial public offering.

Under Adams’ tenure, United completed 33 acquisitions. In 2022, American Banker named Richard Adams the “longest-serving CEO among the top 100 U.S. banks” after 47 years. Richard “Rick” Adams, Jr., who served as United’s President since 2014, became CEO in April 2022.

Acquisitions
The company has made the following acquisitions:

References

External links

1839 establishments in West Virginia
1980s initial public offerings
Banks based in West Virginia
Banks established in 1839
Holding companies of the United States
1839 establishments in Virginia